Stéphanie Dubois was the defending champion, but lost to Julia Cohen in the first round.

Melanie Oudin won the title, defeating Irina Falconi in the final, 7–6(7–0), 3–6, 6–1.

Seeds

Main draw

Finals

Top half

Bottom half

References
 Main Draw*

Boyd Tinsley Women's Clay Court Classic - Singles